Plessur  may refer to:

Plessur (district), an administrative district in the canton of Graubünden, Switzerland
Plessur Range, a mountain range of the Alps
Plessur (river), a river in the canton of Graubünden, which discharges into the Rhine